The surnames MacGavin and McGavin are Scottish surnames, which are possibly variations of the surnames McGowan and MacGowan, which are Anglicised forms of the Scottish Gaelic MacGobhann and Irish Gaelic Mac Gabhann, meaning "son of the smith". When the surname MacGavin and McGavin originate from Glasgow and Moray, they can be represented in Scottish Gaelic as Mac a' Ghobhainn.

People with the surnames
McGavin
Andrew McGavin (1879–1946), Canadian political figure
Charles McGavin (1874–1940), US political figure
Darren McGavin (1922–2006), US film and television actor
Donald Johnstone McGavin (1876–1960), New Zealand surgeon
George McGavin (born 1954), British entomologist, television presenter
Hugh McGavin (1874–1958), Canadian political figure
Janis McGavin (fl. 2000–present), Australian actor
Lawrie Hugh McGavin (1861–1932), British surgeon
Steve McGavin (born 1969), English former professional footballer.
William McGavin (1773–1832), Scottish businessman, religious figure

References

Anglicised Scottish Gaelic-language surnames
Patronymic surnames